Chris Long is an English television producer and director.

He was lead director and executive producer on The Americans. He was the director and executive producer on Suspicion. This is his second series for Apple having directed and executive produced the first episode of Amazing Stories. In 2019 he also directed the pilot episode of The Right Stuff.

Filmography

As a director
 Lois & Clark: The New Adventures of Superman (1996)
 Gilmore Girls (2001)
 Smallville (2001)
 Weeds (2006)
 Supernatural (2006)
 The Mentalist  (2008)
 Jonas  (2009)
 Charmed (2001–2003)
 The Americans (2016–2018)
 The Man in the High Castle (2016)
 Amazing Stories (2020)
 The Right Stuff (2020)
 Suspicion (2022)
 The Patient (2022)

As a producer
 Timecop (1997)
 Gilmore Girls (2003–2004)
 Dirt (2007–2008)
 The Mentalist (2008–2015)
 A Tale of Two Thieves (2014)
 The Americans (2016–2018)
 The Patient'' (2022)

External links
 
https://web.archive.org/web/20120829034645/http://www.chrislongdirector.com/

References

British emigrants to the United States
American television directors
American television producers
Living people
Place of birth missing (living people)
Year of birth missing (living people)